Ca'Purange is an album by saxophonist Dexter Gordon which was recorded in 1972 and released by Prestige.

Reception

Scott Yanow of Allmusic states, "Gordon was somewhat forgotten in the United States at the time (his "comeback" was still four years away), but is in excellent form".  John Barret Jr. reviewed the CD reissue for All About Jazz in 1999 stating "This one takes a little while to hit its stride, but when it does, you’ll probably find something you like... It’s an enjoyable album; when Dexter gets going, he really goes. But his fans already know that".

Track listing 
 "Ca'Purange" (Natalicio Moreira Lima) – 9:50
 "The First Time Ever I Saw Your Face" (Ewan MacColl) – 5:51
 "Oh! Karen O" (Dexter Gordon) – 12:06
 "Airegin" (Sonny Rollins) – 5:05
 "Airegin" [alternative take] (Rollins) – 5:32 Bonus track on CD reisuue

Source:

Personnel 
Dexter Gordon – tenor saxophone
Thad Jones – trumpet, flugelhorn
Hank Jones – piano
Stanley Clarke – double bass
Louis Hayes – drums

Source:

References 

Dexter Gordon albums
1973 albums
Prestige Records albums
Albums produced by Ozzie Cadena
Albums recorded at Van Gelder Studio